Panjshanbeh Bazar may refer to:
 Panjshanbeh Bazar, Chabahar
 Panjshanbeh Bazar, Dashtiari, Chabahar County